David Sierra Treviño (born 30 June 1991) better known by his stage name MC Davo, is a Mexican rapper, singer and composer signed with Warner Music Group. He became popular in 2012 through his huge success in social networks, with his demo "Psicosis" (2012) "Psicosis II" (2014), which were widely viewed on YouTube with millions of views. "Mis Defectos" is the first single from his second album, available on the market since 2014, entitled El Dominio. In 2015, MC Davo released his third album entitled "El Dominio (Deluxe)", which included songs like "La Propusta", "El Mañana" and "Quimica". He worked with artists such as C-Kan, Adán Zapata, and Darkiel.

Career

2008–2009 
Its beginnings in the genre of rap, go back to its alliance with more rappers MC Aese of its native city Monterrey like way of support to be able to fix his race. The main support was his friend, Israel Flores, well known with the nickname of Went, that had its own crew of Hip-hop called WOW Crew.

2016–present 
In March he signed with Warner Music México. to distribute his music to a more global and international level, taking his first studio album The Domain with 15 songs. In June 2014 he released the video of the single Andamos de parranda, which already has more than 30 million views on YouTube. In July, he released a collaboration with Smoky, the proposal that forms part of the album El dominio deluxe. In August, MC Davo made collaborations with C-Kan on the album The Take Over, Mastered Trax Latino.

Awards and nominations

Tours
 2016 MC Davo VS C-Kan
 2016 2 Hombres de Cuidado ft. C-Kan

Discography

Studio albums 
 2012 Psicosis.
 2014 Psicosis II.
 2015 El Dominio.
 2016 El Dominio (Deluxe).
 2017 Las Dos Caras

Videography

Alone 
 2013 "Mis Defectos"
 2013 "Debes de Saber"
 2013 "Me Iré"
 2013 "Ella Es Una Amenaza"
 2014 "Andamos De Parranda"
 2014 "Ya No Hay Nada"
 2016 "Jugar Con Hombres Te Encanta"
 2016 "Amo Tus Fotos"
 2016 "Fin de Semana"
 2017 "Verde, Blanco y Rojo"
 2017 "Magica"
 2017 "Si Ella Supiera"

As lead artist
 2012 "Aparentan" feat. Adán Zapata
 2012 "Los Buenos" feat. Fatboi
 2013 "Adios" feat. Meny Méndez
 2015 "El Mañana" feat. Meny Méndez
 2015 "Quimica" feat. I-Majesty
 2015 "La Propuesta" feat. Smoky
 2016 "Round 3" feat. C-Kan
 2016 "Toda La Noche" feat. Darkiel
 2017 "Round 4" feat. C-Kan

As featured artist
 2012 "Esta Vida Me Encanta (Remix)" feat. Zimple, Big Metra by C-Kan
 2013 "Vuelve" by C-Kan
 2013 "Mi Musica Es Un Arma" feat. Zimple by C-Kan
 2014 "En Mi Corazón" by Arsenal de Rimas
 2015 "Libertad" feat. C-Kan by Elias Diaz
 2015 "Round 1" by C-Kan
 2016 "Round 2" by C-Kan
 2016 "Frenesi" by Paulino Monroy
 2016 "Ay Amor" feat. Ana Torroja by Los Ángeles Azules
 2016 "Si No Estás" by Xriz
 2020: Resistiré México"(among Artists for Mexico)

References 

1991 births
Living people
Mexican male rappers
Singers from Monterrey
Mexican reggaeton musicians